NA-221 Hyderabad-III is a constituency for the National Assembly of Pakistan.

Members of Parliament

2018-2022: NA-221 Hyderabad-III

Election 2002 

General elections were held on 10 Oct 2002. Sahibzada Abul Khair Muhammad Zubair of Muttahida Majlis-e-Amal won by 41,190 votes.

Election 2008 

General elections were held on 18 Feb 2008. Salahuddin of Muttahida Qaumi Movement won by 147,040 votes.

Election 2013 

General elections were held on 11 May 2013. Syed Waseem Hussain of Muttahida Qaumi Movement won by 135,886 votes and became the  member of National Assembly.

Election 2018 

General elections were held on 25 July 2018.

†MQM-P is considered heir apparent to MQM

See also
NA-220 Hyderabad-II
NA-222 Tando Muhammad Khan

References

External links 
Election result's official website

NA-220